Adeyinka Afolayan is a Nigerian Professor of Biochemistry and fellow of the Nigerian Academy of Science, elected into the Academy's Fellowship at its annual general meeting held in 2006.

References

Year of birth missing (living people)
Living people
Nigerian chemists
Biochemists